Maggie is an American television sitcom created by Justin Adler and Maggie Mull, based on the short film of the same name by Tim Curcio. It premiered on Hulu on July 6, 2022. In September 2022, the series was cancelled after one season.

Premise 

Maggie tells the story of a psychic who has visions of the future.

Cast and characters

Main 

 Rebecca Rittenhouse as Maggie
 David Del Rio as Ben
 Nichole Sakura as Louise
 Angelique Cabral as Amy
 Chloe Bridges as Jessie
 Ray Ford as Angel
 Leonardo Nam as Dave
 Kerri Kenney-Silver as Maria
 Chris Elliott as Jack

Recurring 

 Adam Korson as Daniel
 Trent Garrett as John
 Andy Favreau as Sam
 Martin Mull as Zach
 Brent Bailey as Spencer
 Ryan Caltagirone as James
 Jake Lockett as Plant Guy

Episodes

Production

Development 
The series received a pilot order from ABC in January 2021. Justin Adler and Maggie Mull were set to write and executive produce the series. Evan Hayes also serves as executive producer, with 20th Television producing. In April 2021, Natalia Anderson joined as director of the pilot. One month later, Maggie received a series order, with Jeff Morton joining as executive producer. In January 2022, the series moved from ABC to Hulu. On September 9, 2022, Hulu cancelled the series after one season.

Casting 
Rebecca Rittenhouse was cast as the title role in March 2021. David Del Rio, Chris Elliott, Ray Ford, and Leonardo Nam joined the cast one month later. Later that month, Nichole Sakura, Angelique Cabral, Chloe Bridges, and Kerri Kenney-Silver joined as series regulars. In October 2021, Adam Korson joined in a recurring role.

Release 
Maggie streams on Hulu. Internationally Maggie streams on Disney+ as a  Star Original.

Reception 
 The website's critics consensus reads, "For a sitcom with such a heady concept, Maggie can feel flimsily slight, but its disarming unpretentiousness and charming cast point to a promising enough future." Metacritic, which uses a weighted average, assigned a score of 65 out of 100 based on 8 critics, indicating "generally favorable reviews".

References

External links 
 
 

2020s American romantic comedy television series
2020s American single-camera sitcoms
2022 American television series debuts
2022 American television series endings
English-language television shows
Hulu original programming
Television series by 20th Century Fox Television
Television shows about psychic powers
Live action television shows based on films